Bilge Tarhan (12 February 1941 – 9 October 2016) was a Turkish footballer. He competed in the men's tournament at the 1960 Summer Olympics.

References

External links
 

1941 births
2016 deaths
Turkish footballers
Olympic footballers of Turkey
Footballers at the 1960 Summer Olympics
People from Karaman
Association football forwards